Tristão da Cunha (sometimes misspelled Tristão d'Acunha; ; c. 1460 – c. 1507) was a Portuguese explorer and naval commander. In 1499, he served as ambassador from King Manuel I of Portugal to Pope Leo X, leading a luxurious embassy presenting in Rome the new conquests of Portugal. He later became a member of the Portuguese privy council.

1506 voyage
Da Cunha was born in Portugal, c. 1460. He was nominated as first viceroy of Portuguese India in 1504, but could not take up this post owing to temporary blindness.

In 1506 he was appointed commander of a fleet of 15 ships sent to the east coast of Africa and off India. His cousin, Afonso de Albuquerque, was in charge of a squadron of five vessels in this fleet that subsequently detached. Their mission was to conquer Socotra Island and build a fortress there, hoping to close the trade in the Red Sea. They sailed together until they reached Mozambique.  In the Mozambique Channel they found his friend Captain João da Nova stranded while returning from India. They rescued him and the ship Frol de la mar, both joining the fleet. After a series of successful attacks on Arab cities on the east coast of Africa, they headed to Socotra.

Discovery of Tristan da Cunha Archipelago
On this voyage Tristão da Cunha discovered a group of remote islands in the south Atlantic Ocean,  from South Africa. Although rough seas prevented a landing then, he named the main island after himself, Ilha de Tristão da Cunha, which was later anglicized to Tristan da Cunha.

Battle of Barawa

He then set his eyes on Ajuran Empire territory, where the Battle of Barawa was fought. The Portuguese soldiers burned the city and looted it. The inhabitants who had fled to the interior would eventually return and rebuild the city. Tristão da Cunha was wounded in this battle. After that battle, he captured Socotra, passing near Mogadishu.

Capture of Socotra
In 1507, a Portuguese fleet commanded by Tristão da Cunha with Afonso de Albuquerque landed at the then capital of Suq and captured the port after a stiff battle. Their objective was to set a base in a strategic place on the route to India and to liberate the presumed friendly Christians from Islamic rule. The architect Tomás Fernandes started to build a fortress at Suq, the Forte de São Miguel de Socotorá. The lack of a proper harbour for wintering led to the loss of many moored Portuguese ships, the most important of which was the Santo António galleon under the command of captain Manuel Pais da Veiga.  The infertility of the land led to famine and sickness in the garrison, and the Portuguese abandoned the island in 1511.

Actions in India
After a while, he distinguished himself in India in various actions, such as the Siege of Cannanore: the Portuguese garrison was on the verge of being overwhelmed, when on 27 August the fleet of 11 ships under Tristão da Cunha coming from Socotra appeared and relieved them with 300 men.

Embassy to Pope Leo X

After returning to Europe, Tristão da Cunha was sent as ambassador from King Manuel I to Pope Leo X in 1514 to present the new conquests of the Portuguese Empire, having Garcia de Resende as his secretary.

The huge, luxurious embassy of one hundred and forty persons made its way through Alicante and Majorca, arriving on the outskirts of Rome in February. They walked the streets of Rome on March 12, 1514 in an extravagant procession of exotic wildlife and wealth of the Indies, with many dressed in "Indian style". The procession featured an elephant named Hanno, as a gift to the pope, and forty-two other beasts, including two leopards, a panther, some parrots, turkeys and rare Indian horses. Hanno carried a platform of silver on its back, shaped as a castle containing a safe with royal gifts, including vests embroidered with pearls and gems, and coins of gold minted for the occasion.
The pope received the procession in the Castel Sant'Angelo. The elephant knelt down thrice in reverence and then, following a wave of his Indian mahout (keeper), used its trunk to suck water from a bucket and sprayed it over the crowd and the Cardinals.

By 29 April 1515, the Portuguese had depleted their funds, but they sought a  bull signed by the pope, who sent back rich gifts to King Manuel. The king responded with a ship full of spices and, later, an Indian rhinoceros sent to him from the sultan Muzaffar Shah II of Gujarat. The boat that transported it was wrecked off Genoa on early February 1516, and the rhinoceros was portrayed by Albrecht Dürer in his very famous Rhinoceros woodcuts in June of 1516 after sketches of it traveled to Nuremberg.

Although Tristão da Cunha had never assumed the post of Viceroy of India, his son Nuno da Cunha was the 9th Governor of Portuguese India in 1529. The tomb of Tristão da Cunha is located at the convent of Nossa Senhora da Encarnação in Olhalvo (in the municipality of Alenquer).

See also
Rua do Cunha

References

External links
 Tristan da Cunha island article in Italian

1460s births
1540s deaths
History of Kerala
Portuguese explorers
Portuguese diplomats
Ambassadors of Portugal to the Holy See
16th-century explorers
Maritime history of Portugal
15th-century Portuguese people
16th-century Portuguese people